Corryton, also known as Corryton Village, is an unincorporated bedroom community in northeastern Knox County, Tennessee, United States, about 15 miles northeast of Knoxville. The United States Geographic Names System classifies Corryton as a populated place. It is included in Knoxville Metropolitan Statistical Area.

Geography
Corryton is situated near two mountains, House Mountain (the highest point in Knox County) and Clinch Mountain. It includes a grade school, a public library, community center, and several churches including Little Flat Creek Baptist Church (founded in 1797, making it the first Baptist church organized in Knox County), Corryton Church (formerly Corryton Baptist) and Rutherford Memorial United Methodist.

History
John Sawyers, a Revolutionary War veteran, settled in the vicinity of what is now Corryton in 1785.  He subsequently built a small fort along the Emory Road.  The community remained primarily agricultural until the construction of the Knoxville, Cumberland Gap and Louisville Railroad through the area in the late 1880s.  The rail station that served the community was initially known as "Floyd."

In 1887, a developer named Corryton Woodbury purchased property surrounding the rail depot to grow the community into a suburban town. The lots failed to sell, and the venture was unsuccessful, with the community remaining a predominantly rural hamlet.

The photographs were published in National Geographic magazine. This world record stood until 2003 when it was broken in Argentina, but still stands as a U.S. national record.

Notable people
Kenny Chesney – country music singer-songwriter, Gibbs High School alumni
Phil Leadbetter – bluegrass musician, Gibbs High School alumni
Ashley Monroe – singer-songwriter, Gibbs High School alumni
Morgan Wallen – country pop singer-songwriter, Gibbs High School alumni

References

Unincorporated communities in Tennessee
Unincorporated communities in Knox County, Tennessee
Knoxville metropolitan area